Justinus (Latin: Justinus or Iustinus) may refer to:

People known by the name alone
Justinus van Nassau (1559–1631), son of William of Orange ("the Silent")
Justin Martyr (also "Iustinus", 100–165), Christian martyr
Justin (historian) (Marcus Junianius (or Junianus) Justinus), a Latin historian who lived under the Roman Empire

People with the given name
Justinus Kerner (1786–1862), German poet
Justinus Darmojuwono (1914–1994), Indonesian cardinal
Justinus van der Brugghen (1804–1863), Dutch politician
Sebald Justinus Brugmans (1763–1819), Dutch botanist

See also 
Justin (disambiguation)